More Fish is the sixth studio album by rapper Ghostface Killah, released on December 12, 2006 through the Def Jam label. The album's name derives from Ghostface's earlier 2006 release, Fishscale. The track "Good", featuring Ghostface's fellow Theodore Unit member Trife Da God and Mr. Maygreen, and produced by Kool-Aid & Peanut, was the first single. It contains one track, "Josephine," which was originally featured on Hi-Tek's Hi-Teknology 2: The Chip, but all other tracks are made of previously unreleased material.

The album features several appearances from the members of Theodore Unit (Cappadonna, Shawn Wigs, Trife Da God and Ghostface's teenage son, Sun God), as well as from Redman, Sheek Louch, Killa Sin, Kanye West and singers Amy Winehouse, Eamon, Ne-Yo and Mr. Maygreen. Production comes from Jim Bond, Hi-Tek, Kool-Aid & Peanut, Madlib, MF Doom, Mark Ronson, Lewis Parker, Xtreme, Fantom of the Beats, and Ghostface himself.

Critical reception 

More Fish received generally positive reviews from music critics. At Metacritic, which assigns a normalized rating out of 100 to reviews from critics, the album received an average score of 77, which indicates "generally favorable reviews", based on 21 reviews. Andy Kellman of AllMusic said, "Loosely speaking, More Fish is to Fishscale what Theodore Unit's 718 was to The Pretty Toney Album, albeit with more focus on Ghostface. While the title of this disc seems synonymous with Have Some Leftovers, it's not at all stale, if not nearly as spectacular as its precursor." Nathan Rabin of The A.V. Club said, "More Fish's lively assortment of odds and ends contains a few Fishscale-worthy gems, like the continental sophistication of the Mark Ronson-produced "You Know I'm No Good" and the MF Doom-produced "Alex," where Ghostface spins a head-spinning narrative so complex and detailed that it takes several listens to just to process everything. Fishscale was named after a particularly expensive and pure form of cocaine. More Fish's sonic fix is of a lesser quality, but it still packs a potent punch." A. L. Friedman of PopMatters said, "Like any compilation, More Fish doesn’t make much of a statement, except maybe that Ghostface is prolific, and that similar collections may have been left on the cutting room floor from his earlier work. And that’s just frustrating. But all told, there’s enough to make this little Def Jam tax write-off worthy of a listen for anyone that liked Fishscale, not just Ghostface completists."

Ryan Dombal of Pitchfork Media said, "Tucked away beneath the label's fourth-quarter heavy-hitters, More Fish is, appropriately, a fraction of the event Fishscale was. And while new material from one of the most consistent rappers of all time is always welcome, the new album's stealth release doubles as an admission of Ghost's limited commercial potential. The redundant title alone-- here ya go, More Fish!-- goes lengths to lower expectations." Simon Vozick-Levinson of Entertainment Weekly said, "The Wu-Tang Clan’s most reliable warrior extends his string of triumphs with More Fish, the sequel to his March release, Fishscale. Six discs into his solo career, Ghostface Killah handily delivers everything that his fans expect: nostalgic soul samples, richly detailed scenes of street life, and an abundance of inventive wordplay (”A shark’s teeth ain’t sharp enough/I’m like Mount St. Helen when the god erupt”)." Amanda Diva of XXL said, "Sometimes leftovers can be just as good as the original meal. Such is the case with Ghostface’s latest offering, More Fish. At first glance, this follow-up to last year’s Fishscale seems like nothing more than a Theodore Unit compilation, as names like Trife Da God and Sun God (Ghost’s son), as well as Wu-Tang affiliates Cappadonna and Killa Sin, flood the guest list. Despite the extra weight, Ghost still manages to pull off a surprisingly focused project."

Commercial performance
More Fish debuted at number 71 on the U.S. Billboard 200, selling about 36,000 copies in its first week.

Track listing 

Sample credits
"Ghost Is Back" contains a sample of "Juice (Know the Ledge)" by Eric B. & Rakim.
"Miguel Sanchez" contains a sample of "Love is Life" by Earth, Wind & Fire.
"Guns N' Razors" contains a sample of "Villains Theme" from Spider-Man.
"Outta Town Shit" contains a sample of "Drama Backcloth" by Alan Tew.
"Good" contains a sample of "Love Music" by Earth, Wind & Fire.
"Street Opera" contains a sample of "Ain't No Sunshine" by Michael Jackson.
"Block Rock" contains a sample of "Dronsz" by Novalis.
"Miss Info Celebrity Drama" contains a sample of "On Top" by Lonnie Youngblood.
"Pokerface" contains a sample of "Wichita Lineman" by Sunday's Child.
"Greedy Bitches" contains a sample of "TB Sheets" by Van Morrison.
"Grew Up Hard" contains a sample of "Crossing the Bridge" by Inez Foxx.
"Blue Armor" contains a sample of "Innocent Hearts" by John Farnham.
"Alex (Stolen Script)" contains a sample of "The Thief Who Came to Dinner" by Henry Mancini.
"Gotta Hold On" contains a sample of  "Hold On (I Think Our Love is Changing)" by The Crusaders.
"Back Like That" (Remix) contains a sample of "Baby Come Home" by Willie Hutch.

Personnel

Artists
 Ghostface Killah – primary artist (tracks 1–11, 13–15, 17)
 Trife da God – featured artist (tracks 2, 3, 5, 11), primary artist (track 12)
 Sun God – featured artist (tracks 1, 6)
 Cappadonna – featured artist (track 3)
 Killa Sin – featured artist (track 3)
 Mr. Maygreen – featured artist (track 5)
 Shawn Wigs – featured artist (tracks 9, 10)
 Redman – featured artist (track 10)
 The Willie Cottrell Band – featured artists (track 11)
 Solomon Childs – featured artist (track 12)
 Sheek Louch – featured artist (track 13)
 Eamon – featured artist (track 16)
 Kanye West – featured artist (track 17)
 Ne-Yo – featured artist (track 17)
 Billie Cottrell – vocals (track 11)
 Michelle Cohen – vocals (track 11)
 Willie Cottrell – vocals (track 11)
 Tristan Wilds – background artist (track 1)
 Mario "Big O" Caruso – background artist (track 4)
 Jamie Seth – background artist (track 13)
 Miss Info – skit (track 8)
 Eric Edwards – skit (track 8)
 Tracy Morgan – skit (track 10)
Technical personnel
 Tony Dawsey – mastering (all tracks)
 Jason Goldstein – mixing (track 1)
 Anthony "Acid" Caputo – mixing (tracks 2–4, 6–13, 15–17), recording (tracks 1–13, 15–17)
 Jason Goldstein – mixing (track 5)
 Chach – mixing (track 11)
 Hi-Tek – mixing, recording (track 11)
 Tom Elmhirst – mixing (track 14)
 Nikos Teneketzis – mixing (track 17)
 Lucas McClellan – co-mixing (tracks 2–4, 6–16)
 Christian Baker – mixing assistant (tracks 1–13, 15, 16)
 Matt Paul – mixing assistant (track 14)
 Vaughan Merrick – recording (track 14)
 Michael Tocci – recording (track 17)
 Jesse Gladston – engineer assistant (track 14)
 Mike Makowski – engineer assistant (track 14)

Record producers
 Ghostface Killah – production (track 1)
 J-Love – production (track 1)
 Fantom of the Beat – production (track 2, 6, 12)
 MF Doom – production (tracks 3, 15)
 Lewis Parker – production (track 4)
 Koolade – production (track 5)
 Ronald "P-Nut" Frost – production (track 5)
 Madlib – production (track 7)
 K. Slack – production (track 9)
 Anthony Acid – production (track 10, 12, 16)
 Hi-Tek – production (track 11)
 Mark Ronson – production (track 14)
 Xtreme – production (track 17)
 DJ Finesse – scratches (track 1)
 Big D – drums (track 11)
 Homer Steinweiss – drums (track 14)
 Eric "E Dub" Isaacs – additional drums (track 11)
 Larry Cottrell – guitar (track 11)
 Binky Griptite – guitar (track 14)
 Thomas Bernneck – guitar (track 14)
 Nick Movshon – bass guitar (track 14)
 Victor Axelrod – piano (track 14)
 Carolyn "momdukes" Isaacs – keyboards (track 11)
 Ian Hendrickson-Smith – baritone saxophone (track 14)
 Neal Sugarman – tenor saxophone (track 14)
 Dave Guy – trumpet (track 14)
Additional personnel
 Dennis Coles – executive producer, A&R (direction), art direction
 Mike Caruso – executive producer, A&R (direction), management
 The Carter Administration – executive producer
 Scutch Robinson – co-executive producer
 Javon Greene – A&R (administration)
 Terese Joseph – A&R (administration)
 Jonathan Kaslow – A&R (for Starks Enterprises)
 Patrick "Plain Pat" Reynolds – A&R (for Starks Enterprises)
 Lenny Santiago – A&R (Island Def Jam)
 Leesa D. Brunson – A&R (operations)
 Dawud West – art direction
 Tai Linzie – photography and art coordination
 Grace Miguel – creative direction
 Scott Schafer – photography

Charts

References 

2006 albums
Ghostface Killah albums
Def Jam Recordings albums
Albums produced by Hi-Tek
Albums produced by Mark Ronson
Albums produced by Madlib
Albums produced by MF Doom